Gene trapping is a high-throughput approach that is used to introduce insertional mutations across an organism's genome.

Method 
Trapping is performed with gene trap vectors whose principal element is a gene trapping cassette consisting of a promoterless reporter gene and/or selectable genetic marker, flanked by an upstream 3' splice site (splice acceptor; SA) and a downstream transcriptional termination sequence (polyadenylation sequence; polyA).

When inserted into an intron of an expressed gene, the gene trap cassette is transcribed from the endogenous promoter of that gene in the form of a fusion transcript in which the exon(s) upstream of the insertion site is spliced in frame to the reporter/selectable marker gene. Since transcription is terminated prematurely at the inserted polyadenylation site, the processed fusion transcript encodes a truncated and nonfunctional version of the cellular protein and the reporter/selectable marker. Thus, gene traps simultaneously inactivate and report the expression of the trapped gene at the insertion site, and provide a DNA tag (gene trap sequence tag, GTST) for the rapid identification of the disrupted gene.

Access 
The International Gene Trap Consortium is centralizing the data and supplies modified cell lines.

References

Further reading

External links 

Genetics